Immoral Tales is the title of a number of works:

 A 1994 non-fiction book Immoral Tales: European Sex & Horror Movies 1956-1984 by Cathal Tohill and Pete Tombs 
 Immoral Tales (film), a 1973 film by Walerian Borowczyk
 An 1833 novel by Petrus Borel: Champavert, contes immoraux